Ivan Volodymyrovich Kalyuzhnyi (born 21 January 1998) is a Ukrainian professional footballer who plays as a central midfielder for Indian Super League club Kerala Blasters, on loan from Ukrainian Premier League club Oleksandriya.

Club career

Youth and early career
Born in Zolochiv Raion, Kharkiv Oblast, Kalyuzhnyi started his youth career from FC Arsenal Kharkiv after which he moved to Metalist Kharkhiv. His first trainers in Metalist were Volodymyr Linke and Oleh Kramarenko. Later he moved from Kharkiv to Dynamo Kyiv. He played for Dynamo Kyiv U19 team from 2015 to 2018. Kalyuzhnyi managed to score one goal from 12 matches in the UEFA Youth League.

In 2018, Kaliushny was loaned to Metalist 1925 Kharkiv. He made his professional debut with them in the 2018-2019 season and scored one goal in 27 appearances. He was loaned to Rukh in 2019. Kaliushny made his debut in the Ukrainian Premier League for Rukh on 23 August 2020, playing in a losing away match against FC Vorskla Poltava.

In February 2021, Kaliushny made a permanent move to FK Oleksandria. In 23 games total, he scored two goals and provided four assists. Two of these goals were in the Ukrainian Premier League. Kaliuahny made the third loan spell in his career by playing for the Icelandic top division club Keflavik. He arrived at the start of 2022 and made seven appearances.

Kerala Blasters
On 18 July 2022, Indian Super League club Kerala Blasters announced the signing of Kalyuzhnyi, on a season-long loan deal from Oleksandriya for the 2022–23 season. He made his Kerala Blasters debut on 7 October against East Bengal Club by coming in as a substitute for Apostolos Giannou in the 79th minute and scored his debut goal two minutes after in the 81st minute. He doubled his tally in the 89th minute with a left-footed volley from 25 yards and helped the Blasters to seal a 3–1 win, which also won him the Hero of the Match Award. He scored again in their next match against ATK Mohun Bagan FC on 16 October, where he gave an early lead for the Blasters in the 8th minute but the Blasters lost the match 2–5 at full-time. On 13 November, Kalyuzhnyi went top of the ISL goals chart with a long-range screamer in the 52nd minute in a 3–1 win against FC Goa, which helped the Blasters' to win their first match against Goa since 2016, and was also chosen as the man of the match. He won his third MOTM award in their next match versus Hyderabad FC, which they won 0–1.

Career statistics

Club

References

External links 
 
 

1998 births
Living people
Ukrainian footballers
FC Dynamo Kyiv players
FC Metalist 1925 Kharkiv players
FC Rukh Lviv players
FC Oleksandriya players
Knattspyrnudeild Keflavík players
Ukrainian Premier League players
Ukrainian First League players
Úrvalsdeild karla (football) players
Association football midfielders
Ukraine youth international footballers
Ukrainian expatriate footballers
Expatriate footballers in Iceland
Ukrainian expatriate sportspeople in Iceland
Expatriate footballers in India
Ukrainian expatriate sportspeople in India
Sportspeople from Kharkiv Oblast
Kerala Blasters FC players
Indian Super League players